Ernő Gerő (born Ernő Singer; 8 July 1898 – 12 March 1980) was a Hungarian Communist leader in the period after World War II and briefly in 1956 the most powerful man in Hungary as the leader of its ruling communist party.

Early career
Gerő was born in Terbegec, Hont County of the Kingdom of Hungary (now Trebušovce, Slovakia) to Jewish parents, although he later totally repudiated religion. An early Hungarian communist, Gerő fled Hungary for the Soviet Union after Béla Kun's brief Soviet government was overthrown in August 1919. During his two decades living in the USSR, Gerő was an active NKVD agent. Through that association, Gerő was involved in the Comintern—the international organization of communists—in France, and also fought in the Spanish Civil War, during which he performed purges against Trotskyist groups in the International Brigades. As a result he was called the "Butcher of Barcelona".

The outbreak of the Second World War in Europe found him in Moscow again, and he remained for the duration of the war. After the dissolution of the Communist International in 1943, he was in charge of propaganda directed at enemy forces and prisoners of war. Gerő was among the first communist functionaries to return to Hungary in early November 1944. He was a member of Hungary's High National Council (provisional government) between 26 January and 11 May 1945. 

In the November 1945 election, the Hungarian Communist Party, under Gerő and Mátyás Rákosi, got 17% of the vote, compared to 57% for the Smallholders' Party, but the Soviet commander in Hungary, Marshal Kliment Voroshilov, installed a coalition government with communists in key posts. The communists held an election and took full control in 1949, with Rákosi as party leader. Gerő and Mihály Farkas were Rákosi's right-hand men.

Rákosi took over the premiership as well in 1952.  However, his authority was shaken a year later by the death of Stalin, when Imre Nagy took over as prime minister. Gerő was retained as a counterweight to the reformers. Rákosi, having managed to regain control, was then undermined by Nikita Khrushchev's secret speech in early 1956 denouncing Stalinism and forced to leave office on 18 July 1956 by Anastas Mikoyan.  He retained enough influence that the MDP designates Gerő to succeed him as party leader.

Gerő interregnum

Gerő led the country for a brief period, known as the 'Gerő Interregnum', from 18 July 1956 to 24 October 1956, just over three months. He had been Rákosi's close associate since 1948, and was involved in party expulsions, the industrialization and collectivization of Hungary.

Later life and death
On 23 October 1956, students marched through Budapest intending to present a petition to the government. The procession swelled as several people poured onto the streets. Gerő replied with a harsh speech that angered the people, and police opened fire. It proved to be the start of the Hungarian Revolution of 1956.

As the revolution spread throughout the country, the central committee met on 25 October and agreed that János Kádár should be made party leader and Imre Nagy be made prime minister, marking the end of the Gerő interregnum. Gerő went to the Soviet Union, but after the revolution was crushed, the Communist government of Kádár initially refused to let him return to Hungary. He was finally allowed to return from exile in 1960, but was promptly expelled from the Communist Party. He worked as an occasional translator in Budapest during his retirement. His character plays a central role in Vilmos Kondor's 2012 novel, Budapest Noir, and the whole series. He died in Budapest in 1980 at the age of 81.

References

Bibliography

 Almendros, Joaquín: Situaciones españolas: 1936–1939. El PSUC en la guerra civil. Dopesa, Barcelona, 1976.
 Chacón, R.L.: Por qué hice las checas de Barcelona. Laurencic ante el consejo de guerra. Editorial Solidaridad nacional, Barcelona, 1939.
 The First Domino: International Decision Making During the Hungarian Crisis of 1956 Texas A & M University Press, 2004, p. 33.
 Johanna Granville, "Soviet Documents on the Hungarian Revolution, 24 October – 4 November 1956", Cold War International History Project Bulletin, no. 5 (Woodrow Wilson Center for International Scholars, Washington, DC), Spring, 1995, pp. 22–23, 29–34.
 

1898 births
1980 deaths
People from Veľký Krtíš District
People from the Kingdom of Hungary
Slovak Jews
Jewish Hungarian politicians
Hungarian Communist Party politicians
Members of the Hungarian Working People's Party
Members of the Hungarian Socialist Workers' Party
Hungarian Interior Ministers
Finance ministers of Hungary
Members of the National Assembly of Hungary (1945–1947)
Members of the National Assembly of Hungary (1947–1949)
Members of the National Assembly of Hungary (1949–1953)
Members of the National Assembly of Hungary (1953–1958)
Jewish socialists
Jewish atheists
Hungarian atheists
Hungarian people of the Spanish Civil War
Hungarian People's Republic
Hungarian expatriates in the Soviet Union
People of the Hungarian Revolution of 1956